The 1924–25 season was the 16th in the history of the Isthmian League, an English football competition.

London Caledonians were champions, winning their sixth Isthmian League title.

League table

References

Isthmian League seasons
I